Magical creatures are an aspect of the fictional Wizarding World contained in the Harry Potter series and connected media originally created by British author J. K. Rowling. Throughout the seven main books of the series, Harry and his friends encounter many of these creatures on their adventures in Hogwarts, the Forbidden Forest, or other locations throughout the Wizarding World. In addition, students learn to take care of creatures such as hippogriffs and unicorns in the Care of Magical Creatures class at Hogwarts. Rowling has also written Fantastic Beasts and Where to Find Them, a guide to the magical beasts found in the series, and based on the fictional textbook of the same name written by Newt Scamander and used by students at Hogwarts.

Many of these creatures are derived primarily from Greek mythology and other folklore, namely British and Scandinavian. Many of the legends surrounding these mythical creatures are also incorporated in the books. "Children [...] know that I didn't invent unicorns, but I've had to explain frequently that I didn't actually invent hippogriffs," Rowling told Stephen Fry in an interview for BBC Radio 4. "When I do use a creature that I know is a mythological entity, I like to find out as much as I can about it. I might not use it, but to make it as consistent as I feel is good for my plot."

Some creatures in the series are ordinary animals that may be imbued with magical properties or possess certain magical abilities. Owls, for example, deliver mail and have the ability to find the recipient regardless of their location. Other animals such as cats, dogs, frogs, toads, rats and mice do not necessarily have magical abilities.

Magizoology
In the Harry Potter franchise, Magizoology (a portmanteau of "magic" and "zoology") is the study of magical creatures. A person who studies Magizoology is known as a magizoologist. There are magizoologists who work in the Ministry of Magic, particularly in the department for the Regulation and Control of Magical Creatures. One notable magizoologist is Newt Scamander, who is the in-universe author of Fantastic Beasts and Where to Find Them and the protagonist of the Fantastic Beasts franchise, which serves as a prequel to the Harry Potter story.

Regulation and classification

Regulation 
The Department for the Regulation and Control of Magical Creatures of the Ministry of Magic is responsible for overseeing and regulating magical creatures. It is divided into three divisions: the Beast Division, the Being Division, and the Spirit Division.

According to Fantastic Beasts, a "being" is generally defined as "any creature that has sufficient intelligence to understand the laws of the magical community and to bear part of the responsibility in shaping those laws." This includes humans, dwarves, house-elves, giants, goblins, hags, veelas, and vampires. Fairies, pixies, gnomes, and most other creatures are classified as "beasts." Affairs related to ghosts are relegated to the Spirit Division.

These definitions are not without problems: Werewolves and Animagi are typically in human form, but may transform into an animal. (A werewolf transforms from the human state only at the full moon, but an Animagus is a human who has learned to transform into an animal at will.) Their classification is unclear, and offices responsible for werewolves exist in both the Beast and Being Divisions. Dangerous creatures such as Banshees and Dementors have never been officially classified. In addition, some sentient creatures such as centaurs, leprechauns and merpeople have been controversially rejected from the "being" status in favour of "beast" status.

Fantastic Beasts and Where to Find Them also assigns a threat rating to each creature, in the form of "X" marks. Five Xs means "Known wizard killer/impossible to domesticate". Four Xs means "Dangerous/requires specialist knowledge/skilled wizard may handle". Three Xs means "Competent wizard should cope". Two Xs means "Harmless/may be domesticated". One X means "boring". Creatures that need to be treated with a sophisticated amount of respect, e.g. centaurs, unicorns, phoenixes, and merpeople, are also given a XXXX rating.

Classification 
Below is a list of magical creatures mentioned in the Harry Potter universe. For a list of magical plants mentioned in the series, see List of fictional plants.

Beasts 
  – A gigantic spider that is capable of human speech.
  – A serpent-like creature created from ashes from a magical fire.
  – A greyish-green, mournful, looking bird also known as the "Irish Phoenix".
 Basilisk – A giant snake whose stare can kill people in seconds, however it will petrify its victim when seen through a reflective surface. They are created illegally by having a toad sit on and hatch a chicken's egg.
 Bicorn – A cow-like creature that sheds its horns annually. At least one of its horns is used as one of the ingredients for the Polyjuice Potion.
 Bigfoot/Sasquatch – A humanoid ape-like creature native to North America.
  – Vivid blue Australian insects which are common but rarely noticed by Muggles. They have a long curved stinger at the bottom of their bodies. Victims stung will suffer from giddiness, followed by levitation. Several escape Newt Scamander's suitcase in Fantastic Beasts and Where to Find Them.
  – The Blast-Ended Skrewt are a mix between a Manticore and a Fire Crab created by Hagrid. Skrewts make their debut in Goblet of Fire, as one of the creatures that Hagrid teaches the students about as Professor of Care of Magical Creatures. The first fan to learn of the blast-ended skrewts was Catie Hoch, an eight-year-old cancer patient from Albany, New York. Hoch's mother, who had read the first three books to Hoch during her treatment for neuroblastoma, emailed Rowling to ask her when the fourth book would be released, and Rowling gifted Hoch with transatlantic phone calls in which she read her extracts from the unpublished book, including explanations of the blast-ended skrewts, which Rowling described as looking like headless lobsters.
  – An insect-eating, tree-dwelling, wooden creature that is hard to spot. Professor Grubbly-Plank taught the 5th year Care of Magical Creatures class about them while substituting for Hagrid. Rowling has written on Pottermore that they are "selective creatures who only inhabit worthy trees. They are alternatively called 'the wandmaker's friend' as the trees they inhabit can be used to make wand's wood." A particularly needy bowtruckle named Pickett plays a role in the film Fantastic Beasts and Where to Find Them (2016). Pickett is revealed to be Newt Scamander's friend and Leta Lestrange's acquaintance since Newt and Leta's years at Hogwarts, as revealed in The Crimes of Grindelwald.
  – A beast resembling a patch of greenish fungus with eyes.
 Centaur – A creature whose head and upper torso resembles a humans but lower body including the four legs and tail resembles a horse.
 Chimaera – A creature with the head of a lion, the body of a goat, and the tail of a dragon from Greek mythology.
  – A parasite resembling a crab, living on the fur and feathers of Crups and Augureys.
 Chupacabra – A blood-sucking creature from Mexico that is half-lizard, half-homunculus.
  – A tree-dwelling creature resembling a cross between a frog and a monkey.
 Cockatrice – A creature that resembles a rooster with a lizard tail. Its stare also kills people in seconds.
  – A magical breed of dog resembling a Parson Russell Terrier/Jack Russell Terrier but with a forked tail.
  – A docile orangutan-like creature that can turn invisible. The creature's sight is based on precognition. An escaped Demiguise plays a role in the film Fantastic Beasts and Where to Find Them (2016). Their pelts are often used to make Invisibility Cloaks.
  – Also known as the dodo by muggles, is a bird that can disappear when threatened. According to Newt Scamander, this ability is the reason why muggles think it is extinct.
  – A small fairy-like creature with four arms and four legs, also known as the Biting Fairy. In Fantastic Beasts and Where to Find Them, they appear more like lizards.

 Dragon – Dragons are winged fire-breathing reptiles. In the films, the dragons are depicted as having wings in place of their arms and walk on them like bats. Their heartstrings are one of the three main wand cores.
 – A species of dragon native to the valleys of New Zealand with pearly scales and multicolored, pupiless eyes.
  – A species of dragon native to China. It is also known as the Lion Dragon, red with a fringe of golden spikes around its face. Its name comes from the mushroom-shaped ball of fire it emits from its nostrils. Viktor Krum faced one for the first task of the Triwizard Tournament.
  – A species of dragon native to Wales. The notorious Ilfracrombe Incident was caused by a Welsh Green, when it attacked a beach of Muggles. Fortunately, a Wizarding family on holiday prevented any fatalities. Fleur Delacour faced one for the first task of the Triwizard Tournament.
  – A species of dragon native to the Hebrides Islands of Scotland. Black, with rough scales and brilliant purple eyes.
  – A species of dragon native to Hungary. It is considered the most dangerous of the dragons. Black and lizard-like with bronze spikes down its back, and on its tail. Can shoot fire up to 50 feet. Harry faces one as the first task in the Triwizard Tournament in Harry Potter and the Goblet of Fire.
  – A species of dragon native to the northern mountains of Norway. Hagrid received a Norwegian Ridgeback egg and named the hatchling "Norbert". He ended up having to give Norbert to Charlie Weasley, who worked at a dragon reserve. He discovered that "Norbert" was actually female and renamed her Norberta. 
  – A venomous species of dragon native to the eastern and northeastern parts of Peru. It is considered the smallest and fastest of the dragons. 
  – A species of dragon native to the mountains of Romania. They are deep green with long golden horns.
  – A species of dragon native to the northern mountains of Sweden. A pretty silver-blue dragon whose blue flame reduces its targets to bone in a matter of seconds. Cedric Diggory faced one for the first task of the Triwizard Tournament.
  – A species of dragon native to Ukraine, and the largest species of dragon ever recorded.
 Dugbog – A crocodilian-like creature resembling a piece of dead wood while stationary.
 Erkling – An elvish creature that uses music to lure in human children and eat them.
 Erumpent – A creature that appears as a rhinoceros with a roundish body and has explosive liquid in its horn and can blow up at the slightest touch. Xenophilius Lovegood had an Erumpent horn in his house which he called "the horn of a Crumple-Horned Snorkack", but Hermione was able to recognise it as an Erumpent horn. It then blew up his house as depicted in Harry Potter and the Deathly Hallows.

 Fairy – A small human-like creature with insect wings. Immensely proud and rather stupid.
  – Despite its name, the Fire Crab resembles a cross between a tortoise and a crab. It shoots fire from its rear-end when threatened.
 Fire-Dwelling Salamander – A lizard-like creature that lives and feeds on the flames.
  – A garden-slug-like creature with corrosive spittle.
  – A 10-inch toothless brown worm with no notable magical abilities, though it can be used in potion making.
  – A brightly coloured bird that has a high pitched, twittering song that would drive the listener insane.
Ghoul – A creature that resembles a slimy buck-toothed ogre.
Chameleon Ghoul – A ghoul that can disguise itself as an everyday object to evade detection.
 Giant squid – A huge creature that lives in the Black Lake near Hogwarts.
  – An insect resembling a bumblebee that produces a treacle that induced melancholy in those who consume it.
Gnome – Gnomes are known to infest the gardens of wizarding households and are found in Europe and North America.
  – A small golden bird that was used in the earlier versions of Quidditch as the Golden Snitch.
  – A creature built like a condylarth; similar to a smilodon but with horns on its head and slimy tentacles in its mouth. They are the favorite mounts of the Mountain Trolls, much to the dismay of the Graphorns.

 Griffin – A creature that is part-eagle, part-lion.
 Grindylow – A small horned water demon with grasping fingers. The films give them octopus tentacles for legs, though they are not described as such in the novels.
 Gytrash – A dog-like spirit similar to the souls of ghosts.
 Hidebehind – A magical creature that is the result of illegally mating a Demiguise and a ghoul.
 Hippocampus – A sea creature with the head and front legs of a horse and back and tail of a fish.
Hippogriff – A creature that is part-eagle, part-horse. Wizards can own them provided they cast a daily Disillusionment Charm on them. 
 Hodag – A cynodont-like creature with horns resembling a cross between a frog and a dog.
 Horklump – A pink fleshy creature resembling a mushroom, with no discernible purpose.
 Horned Serpent – A giant sea serpent with horns.
 Imp – Imps are found in Britain and Ireland where they are the same height as pixies.
 Jackalope – A jackrabbit-like creature with antlers of a deer.
 Jarvey – An overgrown ferret-like creature that can talk but in very short, often rude statements.
  – A blue speckled bird that never makes any noise until the moment before it dies. It would then release a long scream, which consisted of every sound it ever heard backwards.
 Kappa – A Japanese river demon. It can exit the water for short periods of time using the hole in its head to store water. One is seen as an attraction at the Circus Arcanus in France in The Crimes of Grindelwald, where Credence is asked to clean it.
Kelpie – A shapeshifting aquatic creature that often appears as a horse with kelp as a mane. When mounted, it drags down and drowns the unfortunate rider. (One large Kelpie is known as the Loch Ness Monster.) 
 Knarl – A hedgehog-like creature that would never trust an owner of the house when given food, instead causes havoc in their garden instead.
  – A cat-like creature with a lion-like mane and tail, spotted, speckled or flecked fur and long ears. Intelligent and independent but may bond with a wizard or witch and can be a good pet. Also known to be able to detect untrustworthy people and mate with regular cats.
 Leprechaun – A dwarf-like creature associated with gold that deceives both wizards and muggles alike.
 Lethifold – A Dementor-like creature that has the taste for human flesh.
 Leucrotta – A moose-like creature with a larger mouth.
 Lobalug – An aquatic creature that spits out venom when threatened but is also used as a weapon by Merpeople.
 Mackled Malaclaw – A sea creature that resembles a lobster. When bitten by a Malaclaw, it had the unusual side effect of making the victim unlucky for up to a week.
 Manticore – A carnivorous creature with the head of a human, body of a lion, a stinger tail like a scorpion, and is capable of human speech, or a scorpion-like creature with five eyes and three tails that can spray an unidentified flaming substance, which can grow to sizes comparable to a dragon, 
 Marmite – A very tiny squid-like beast with longer tentacles and its body glows in the dark.
 Matagot – A cat-like creature that multiplies when attacked.

 Merpeople – Creatures that are half-human half-fish. 
Mermaid – The name for a female merperson.
Merman – The name for a male merperson.
Merrow – A kind of merpeople native to Ireland.
Selkie – A kind of merpeople native to Scotland.
Siren – A kind of merpeople native to Greece. They are the most beautiful of the merpeople.
  – A lizard with silver-green skin native to the British Isles and able to shrink at will. Their hide is used to make purses and wallets that shrink when a stranger approaches.
  – A bovid-like creature that comes out of its burrow during a full moon.
  – Hairless creatures that resemble a large rat with soft, fleshy spines on its back. Despite being rodent-like in nature, Murtlaps are marine-based mammals and can be found on the coastal areas of Britain.
  – A small desman-like creature built like a steropodon; >mole-like appearance with platypus-like features (e.g., having a long, flat tail and webbed feet like those of an otter or a beaver, and its long, flat duck-like bill or snout). Nifflers are obsessed with hoarding shiny objects, which they usually store in their endless pouch until returning to their burrow. 
 Nogtail – A demon resembling a long-legged, stubby-tailed, narrow black-eyed, piglet that haunts farms and barnyards.
 Nundu – A giant leopard-like creature with toxic breath.
  – A plumed, two-legged, winged creature with a serpentine body, resembling a cross between a dragon and a bird. Hatched from eggs, the shells of which are made of the purest silver and worth a fortune. It is choranaptyxic, meaning it will grow or shrink to fit available space.
 Phoenix – Birds able to reincarnate themselves and carry immensely heavy loads, their tears having healing properties. Their song is said to encourage the noble and strike fear into the wicked. Their feathers are one of the three main wand cores. Phoenixes appear to have close ties to the Dumbledore family and remain throughout their owner's life before flying off to points unknown, the most prominent Phoenix in the series being Albus Dumbledore's pet Fawkes. 
 Hoo-hoo – A Japanese species of phoenix.
Pixie – tiny troublemakers found in Britain and Ireland; Cornish pixies appear in Gilderoy Lockhart's Defense Against the Dark Arts class in Harry Potter and the Chamber of Secrets.
 Plimpy – A fish-like creature with legs that Merpeople consider as a pest.
  – A gnome-like demon but resembling a rock instead of a potato.
  – A small satyr-like creature that guards horses.
  – A sphere-shaped custard coloured creature covered in soft fur. A common pet for Wizarding children. 
  – A type of creature illegally bred to resemble the pattern of a breed of horse of the same name.
  – A type of creature illegally bred to have fangs.
  – A round fluffy pink or purple creature sold at Weasley's Wizard Wheezes.
 Qilin – a Chinese scaly deer-like creature that can read and look into a person's soul, and find out if they were pure of heart. If they perceived someone to be pure of heart, they would bow.
 Quintaped – A carnivorous five-legged creature resembling a starfish with a face.
  – A kind of magical fish that guards fishermen.
 Red Cap – A dwarf-like creature resembling a goblin that dyes its hat with its blood of the victim it bludgeoned, which is how it got its name.
 Re'em – A golden oxen-like creature whose blood increases strength of those who drunk it.
 Runespoor – a three-headed giant serpent.
 Sea serpent – A giant snake-like creature that dwells in the ocean.
 Selma – A kind of sea serpent native to Norway.
 Shrake – A magically created fish covered in spines and sought out to destroyed muggle-fishing nets.
 Snallygaster – A bird-dragon hybrid creature related to the Occamy.
 Sphinx – An Egyptian creature that has the head of a human and the body of a lion. The Sphinxes are capable of human speech and are good at giving riddles, puzzles, and enigmas. 
 Streeler – A giant snail that leaves a trail of poisonous slime.
 Swooping Evil – A venomous butterfly-like creature with a skull of a wolf that feeds on human brains.
 Tebo – A warthog-like creature that can turn invisible when threatened.
 Thunderbird – An American bird-like creature mainly found in Arizona with the power to cause thunderstorms.
 Troll – An about 12 ft. tall creature with prodigious strength and immense stupidity. Certain intelligent trolls can be specially-trained to be Security Trolls where they guard certain places and objects in the Wizarding Society. The different media appearances depict the trolls with a certain number of fingers and a certain number of toes.
  – A race of green-skinned trolls with four fingers and three toes and hair that are native to forests and woodlands.
  – A race of bald-headed, pale-gray trolls with four fingers two toes that are native to mountains. One was let into Hogwarts by Professor Quirinus Quirrell and was defeated by Ron Weasley.
  – A race of hairy purple-skinned trolls with short horns, five fingers, and five toes that lurk in the middle of rivers or under bridges.
 Trollcleg – A kind of fly that hovers around trolls.
 Trollwig – A kind of earwig that feeds on the earwax of trolls.
 Unicorn – A horse-like creature with a horn protruding out of its forehead that are considered "pure." Their hairs are one of the three main wand cores and their horn is used in some potions. They are born as golden coloured, and gradually become white as they grow into adults. They are very hard to catch. It is said in Harry Potter and the Philosopher's Stone that if one drinks a unicorn's blood, it will give that person long-lasting life. However, it also eternally curses that person.
 Winged Horse – A horse with wings. Wizards can own them provided they cast a daily Disillusionment Charm on them.
  – A giant palomino breed. Drinks only single-malt whiskey.
  – A chestnut breed that is popular in Britain and Ireland.
  – A gray breed that is particularly fast.
 Thestral – A black skeletal breed that is only visible to those that have witnessed death. It is said in Harry Potter and the Order of the Phoenix that because of this, they are considered unlucky by many wizards.
 Vampyr Mosp – A fanged moth-wasp hybrid.
 Wampus cat – A six-legged puma-like creature
 Werewolf – A human being that can turn into a wolf when in full moon.
 Michigan Dogman – A kind of werewolf native to Wexford County, Michigan.
 Rougarou – A kind of werewolf native to the United States and Canada.
 White River Monster – A monstrous fish that dwells in the White River which it was named after.
 Wrackspurt – An invisible magical creature that, when floated into a person's ears, makes their brain become unfocused and confused.
 Yeti – A humanoid ape-like creature with white fur native to the Himalayas, e.g. from Tibet to Nepal.
 Zouwu – An elephant-sized cat able to travel large distances.

Beings 
 Dwarf – A short stocky humanoid creature.
 Curupira – A red-haired species of dwarf native to Brazil.
 Giant – A very large humanoid whose intelligence is much higher than a troll's.
 Goblin – Another short stocky humanoid creature that is associated with working in banks.
 Pukwudgie – A species of goblin native to North America.
 Hag – A species of old, wrinkled witch.
 House-elf – A short skinny humanoid that does house chores similar to a brownie.
 Yumbo – White-skinned species of [elf native to Senegal, in Africa.
 Ogre – A large stocky humanoid creature resembling a buck-toothed ghoul.
 Vampire
 Sasabonsam – A red-haired, white-skinned species of vampire native to Ghana, in Africa.
 Veela – Semi-humans, highly attractive, looking sometimes like an exceptionally beautiful girl, and sometimes like a harpy, and having a power to bewitch and enchant men.
 Werewolf – A human being that unwillingly turns into a wolf during the full moon.
 Michigan Dogman – A kind of werewolf native to Wexford County, Michigan.
 Rougarou – A kind of werewolf native to the United States and Canada.

Spirits 
 Banshee – A female spirit who heralds the death of a family member, usually by shrieking or keening.
 Caipora – A dwarf-like spirit of the forests native to Brazil.
 Ghost – A spirit that is actually a soul of a person who has died already.
 Inferius – A zombie-like creature reanimated by dark wizards and witches.
 Poltergeist – Another type of ghost that is associated with haunting certain buildings.
 Zombie – An undead creature reanimated back to life again.

Non-Beings 
Boggart – A shapeshifting creature whose true appearance is unknown but takes the form of the person's worst fear.
Dementors – tall, black-cloaked figures with rotten, skeletal hands; they have the ability to suck a person's soul out through their mouths, and they drain feelings of happiness and joy; employed as the guards of the wizard prison Azkaban; can only be repelled by the Patronus Charm.

Status unknown 
 Bogeyman – A creature that haunts on children when they're being naughty.
 Bugbear – A creature that is similar to a bogeyman and a boggart.
 Dukuwaqa – A person that can turn into a shark.
 Gargoyle – A reanimated statue carved like a demon.
 Sandstone Gargoyle – A species of gargoyle made of sandstone.
 Genie – A magical humanoid that can glide over water.
 Gorgon – A humanoid with a nest full of snakes for hair. Their stare can turn people into stone.
 Harpy – A humanoid creature with wings.
 Hinkypunk – A diminutive, one-legged creature with the appearance of wispy blue, grey or white smoke. Hinkypunks use lanterns to lure unsuspecting people down the wrong path. 
 Hydra – A 9-headed serpentine creature.
 Oni – A Japanese demon resembling a brutish, bulky humanoid; like an orc but with multiple eyes and horns instead.
 Tengu – A goblin-like creature with a long nose and wings located in Japan, similar to a harpy.
 Wood Nymphs – A kind of fairy that is associated with trees.

Notable creatures

Acromantula

In the Harry Potter universe, the Acromantula is a monstrous spider capable of human speech. It originated in Borneo, where it inhabits dense jungle. Its distinctive features include the thick black hair that covers its body; its legspan, which may reach up to fifteen feet; its pincers, which produce a distinctive clicking sound when the Acromantula is excited or angry; and a venomous secretion. The Acromantula is carnivorous and prefers large prey. It spins dome-shaped webs on the ground. The female is bigger than the male and may lay up to one hundred eggs at a time. Soft and white, these are as large as beach balls. The young hatch in six to eight weeks. Acromantula eggs are defined as Class A Non-Tradeable Goods by the department for the Regulation and Control of Magical Creatures, meaning that severe penalties are attached to their importation or sale.

This beast is believed to be wizard-bred, possibly intended to guard wizard dwellings or treasure, as is often the case with magically bred monsters. Despite its near-human intelligence, the Acromantula is untrainable and highly dangerous to wizard and Muggle alike. Hagrid was expelled from Hogwarts in his third year for possession of the Acromantula Aragog who was thought by Hogwarts teachers to be the monster in the Chamber of Secrets. Acromantulas are capable of some form of respect or loyalty, as Aragog refused to allow his children to attack Hagrid because of their past. When Aragog died, Hagrid's protection vanished as Aragog was the only thing holding them back.

Basilisk
In the Harry Potter universe, a Basilisk is a monstrous serpentine creature. Larger than its counterpart from the real-life legend, this Basilisk is capable of reaching a length up to sixty feet and living up to hundreds of years. Basilisks are uncontrollable except by Parselmouths, and the first basilisk is believed to have been created by a Greek Dark wizard and Parselmouth named Herpo The Foul. Herpo made this discovery by hatching a chicken egg under a toad. A male basilisk has a scarlet plume on its head. A basilisk kills both with its powerful venom and its huge yellow eyes, which are immediately fatal to any creature who looks at them directly. To anyone who looks at it indirectly, such as through a camera or in a reflection, it creates a profound state of petrification similar to a Medusa stare. Ghosts who either look at it directly or indirectly will only become petrified since they could not die a second time. A phoenix tear is the only known cure for the devastating effect of the basilisk's venom. Spiders flee from the basilisk, as they are mortal enemies. The basilisk itself flees only from the crowing of a rooster, which if heard by the basilisk is fatal, and the weasel whose odor will also kill a basilisk.

In Harry Potter and the Chamber of Secrets, a female basilisk inhabits the Chamber of Secrets below Hogwarts. When student Tom Riddle, later known as Voldemort, opened the chamber, the basilisk merely petrified several students (students looked at a reflection of basilisk) and killed one student named Myrtle (later known as Moaning Myrtle) with her stare and hid in the chamber for 50 years, until Riddle's memory opened the chamber again by possessing Ginny Weasley. The basilisk attempts to kill several Muggle-borns, but due to good fortune, all its victims were merely petrified. Riddle commanded Ginny Weasley to kill all the school roosters remarked upon by Hagrid. When Harry discovers the chamber, Riddle reveals his identity and sets the basilisk loose upon Harry while Ginny's life force ebbs away. Fawkes helps Harry, by blinding the basilisk with his talons and carrying the Sorting Hat; Harry pulls the sword of Godric Gryffindor from the hat, and uses it to impale the basilisk in the roof of her mouth, killing her.

The basilisk's fangs and her venom absorbed by the sword of Gryffindor proved instrumental for destroying most of Voldemort's Horcruxes. In Chamber of Secrets, while killing the basilisk at the same time, Harry Potter was stabbed in the arm by the first fang, which broke off and was used by Harry to puncture Tom Riddle's diary (one of Voldemort's Horcruxes), an act which restored Ginny's life force. In Harry Potter and the Deathly Hallows, after losing the sword of Gryffindor to Griphook, Ron Weasley and Hermione Granger return to the chamber and retrieve a fang from the dead basilisk's mouth, using it to destroy Helga Hufflepuff's cup. This time the chamber was opened by Ron by imitating Harry's Parseltongue. Ron Weasley, Neville Longbottom, and Professor Dumbledore used the sword of Gryffindor, laced with the basilisk's venom, to destroy the locket, Nagini, and Marvolo Gaunt's ring, respectively.

Boggarts
In the Harry Potter universe, a Boggart is an amortal shape-shifter non-being that takes on the form of its intended victim's worst fear. While British mythology describes boggarts as house-elves who cause trouble or malevolent beings inhabiting marshes or other lonely spots, Rowling's boggarts are more like Fuaths, magical creatures originating from Scotland. However, there is one record of an English (Lancashire) boggart which could take the form of various animals, or indeed more fearful creatures. The word boggart was recorded in the Survey of English Dialects across Cheshire, Derbyshire, Lancashire and Yorkshire as a bogey man.

Boggarts like to hide in dark, enclosed places, such as closets and cabinets. It is unknown what form a boggart chooses to take when alone. (In Harry Potter and the Order of the Phoenix, Mad-Eye Moody determines, with his magical eye, that there is a boggart in the desk in the drawing room.)

In Harry Potter and the Prisoner of Azkaban, Remus Lupin teaches his students in Defence Against the Dark Arts to approach a boggart in groups of two or more, or even to think of several very different frightful beings (Professor Snape and grandmother Augusta, in the case of Neville) so that the boggart will have difficulty in choosing how to frighten whom. The Riddikulus charm is used to combat Boggarts, by changing their appearance into a less fearsome or even comical apparition, which weakens the creatures. When Harry Potter approaches the boggart, it takes the form of a Dementor.

Albus Dumbledore gives the same lesson in Fantastic Beasts: The Crimes of Grindelwald.

Centaurs

Centaurs in the Harry Potter universe are wild creatures who claim to possess intelligence greater than humans. Their heads and torsos resemble those of humans but they possess the four legs, lower bodies and tail of a horse. Although sentient, they have not requested assignment as beings, preferring to remove themselves entirely from human affairs. Centaurs who decide to associate with humans can be seen as traitors to their kind and attacked by other centaurs, as was the case with Firenze, who agreed to teach Divination at Hogwarts. Firenze's interest and involvement with human affairs resulted in violent reprisals by other centaurs and were it not for Hagrid's intervention, Firenze could have been killed.

The Ministry of Magic's Department for the Regulation and Control of Magical Creatures has a Centaur Liaison Office, but no centaur has ever used it. Centaurs are skilled in healing and astrology, and spend much of their time scouring the stars for portents. They live in forests, and their society consists of groups called herds. They do not appear to employ or need any technology more advanced than a bow and arrow. They are proud and territorial, therefore high diplomatic skills must be employed when dealing with centaurs. Displaying lack of respect to centaurs can have violent consequences, as Dolores Umbridge learned to her cost. In Deathly Hallows, the Hogwarts centaur herd, after being admonished fiercely by Hagrid, takes sides with the Order of the Phoenix, and assist in the Battle of Hogwarts.

The films depict the centaurs with bestial and animalistic facial features. The books do not describe them, but several female students are attracted to them.

Named Centaur characters:

 Firenze
 Bane
 Magorian
 Ronan

Dementors

The dementors are "soulless creatures... among the foulest beings on Earth": a phantom species who, as their name suggests, gradually deprive human minds of happiness and intelligence. They are the guards of the wizard prison, Azkaban, until after the return of antagonist Lord Voldemort. Albus Dumbledore harbors an intense dislike of dementors, noting he has long felt the Ministry of Magic erred in "allying" with such creatures, implying that dementor society in general exists apart from the general wizarding world. Dumbledore forbade dementors from entering Hogwarts but this ban was ultimately broken in Harry Potter and the Goblet of Fire by Minister of Magic Cornelius Fudge, who insisted on being accompanied by a dementor as a bodyguard.

In the books, dementors have a generally human shape, approximately 3 metres (10 feet) in height, covered in dark, hooded cloaks that reveal only their decayed-looking hands. Beneath the cloak, dementors are eyeless, and the only feature of note is the perpetually indrawn breath, by which they consume the emotions and good memories of human beings, forcing the victim to relive its worst memories alone. According to the author, dementors grow like fungi in dark, moist places, creating a dense, chilly fog. Although they are implied to be sentient, this is left ambiguous. The presence of a dementor makes the surrounding atmosphere grow cold and dark, and the effects are cumulative with the number of dementors present. The culmination of their power is the 'Dementor's Kiss', wherein the dementor latches its mouth onto a victim's lips and consumes its soul or psyche, presumably to leave the victim in a persistent vegetative state, without any memories and feelings left. Dementors are invisible to Muggles, but affect them otherwise identically.

Despite their attachment to human emotion, dementors seem to have difficulty distinguishing one human from another, as demonstrated by Barty Crouch Jr.'s escape from Azkaban, wherein they could detect no emotional difference between the younger Crouch and his mother. Their sensitivity appears less precise in proportion to the emotion's 'complexity'; this particular weakness enabled Sirius Black, an Animagus, to escape Azkaban by transforming into a dog. The principal method against them is the Patronus Charm, which both protects its user and repels the dementors.

Harry first encounters dementors during his third year of school, when they are sent to guard Hogwarts against Sirius Black, thought to be a dangerous criminal at this point in time. Being reminded by their presence of his parents' murder by Voldemort, Harry asks Remus Lupin for assistance, and thus acquires the Patronus Charm. At the beginning of Order of the Phoenix, two dementors are dispatched to Little Whinging to assassinate Harry, and nearly drain the soul from his cousin Dudley Dursley before Harry drives them off with the Patronus (It is later learned that they were sent by Minister Fudge's corrupt secretary Dolores Umbridge, a possible mole for the Death Eaters). By the novel's end, the dementors of Azkaban stage a mass revolt against their employers to join Voldemort, who permits them nearly free access to victims. In Deathly Hallows, the Ministry, under the control of Voldemort, uses dementors to punish Muggle-borns. The dementors also take Voldemort's side during the Battle of Hogwarts. After the appointment of Kingsley Shacklebolt as Minister of Magic, dementors are removed from Azkaban, and the Ministry contains them by limiting their numbers.

Rowling created the dementors after a time in which she, in her own words, "was clinically depressed".

Ghosts
Ghosts play an important secondary role, mainly as advisors to the leading characters. Unlike the ghosts in a traditional ghost story, these ghosts are neither frightening nor necessarily ghoulish. Ghosts in the novels appear silvery and translucent. They can fly and pass through walls, tables, and other solid objects, but nonetheless have some ability to physically affect, and be affected by, the living world. (Moaning Myrtle, for instance, can splash the water in her toilet.) Ghosts' banquet tables are laden with rotten food, as the decomposition increases their ability to smell and taste it. Touching or walking through a ghost induces a sensation "like walking through an icy shower." Ghosts can be affected by magic and curses, though not to the same degree that living beings can.

In the Harry Potter universe, only wizards and witches can become ghosts. As Nearly Headless Nick explained to Harry, "Wizards can leave an imprint of themselves upon the earth, to walk palely where their living selves once trod ... I was afraid of death. I chose to remain behind. I sometimes wonder whether I oughtn't to have ... Well, that is neither here nor there ... In fact, I am neither here nor there ..." Despite having chosen this afterlife, many ghosts bemoan their inability to eat, and many are described as gloomy. They also harbour an attraction to imagery morbid and melancholy.

Ghosts are very sensitive about their condition: when the Ministry initially classified them as sentient creatures with full legal rights, they claimed that the term was insensitive and received a separate "Spirit Division", apparently to control the activities and haunting locations of troublesome ghosts (as when Myrtle was forced to haunt the place of her death at Hogwarts after she had disrupted the wedding of the brother of Olive Hornby, a girl who had teased her at school).

Named Ghost characters
 Nearly Headless Nick – the Gryffindor house ghost who is nearly headless because he his head is still partly attached. Many students who have lost parents have talked to him about death and the possibility of their loved ones existing as ghosts. After Sirius' death, he tells Harry that he lacked the courage to continue on to the next life beyond the veil. His full name is Sir Nicholas de Mimsy-Porpington.
 The Bloody Baron – the Slytherin house ghost. He murdered Helena Ravenclaw, who became The Grey Lady. He wears chains as a reminder of his crime. He is one of the few characters at Hogwarts who can control Peeves.
 The Grey Lady – the Ravenclaw house ghost. She is the daughter of Hogwarts founder Rowena Ravenclaw. After stealing her mother's diadem, she was killed by The Bloody Baron. Voldemort found the diadem where Helena left it and turned the diadem into a Horcrux. Helena Ravenclaw gave Harry information that helped him find the diadem during the Battle of Hogwarts. In the films, she is friends with Luna Lovegood.
 The Fat Friar – the Hufflepuff house ghost. He's unusually cheerful for a ghost, and always helpful and kind towards students, even those who are not in his House. He's also very tolerant with Peeves' mischiefs. According to Pottermore, he was executed by his own monastic order after showing suspicious signs of magic.
 Professor Binns – the History of Magic professor at Hogwarts. He died in his sleep one day and his ghost simply got up to teach the next day as if nothing had happened. His routine has not varied the slightest since.
 Moaning Myrtle – the ghost of a Ravenclaw girl, killed by a Basilisk, that inhabits the first-floor girls bathroom at Hogwarts.
 Sir Patrick Delaney-Podmore – the leader of the Headless Hunt, a club for decapitated ghosts.

Peeves, the Hogwarts poltergeist, is not considered a ghost, but an "indestructible spirit of chaos" according to Rowling.

Giants
Giants in the Harry Potter universe are capable of interbreeding with humans – Rubeus Hagrid is half-giant, as is his love interest Olympe Maxime – but wizards as a population have engaged in an active campaign to hunt giants out of civilisation. The last giants in Britain were killed apparently by Ministry decree, but most deaths have been due to territorial aggression among themselves as wizards force them to live in ever more confined spaces. The last few giants remaining in the world (the total number is between 70 and 80) are collected together in an isolated region east of Belarus. Giants range in height from 20 to 25 feet, and have skin similar to rhinoceros hide, which grants them limited immunity to magical attacks. Their society is loosely governed by a chief called a Gurg, who spends most of his time demanding food from his underlings.

Voldemort has employed giants in his attacks, after convincing them that he can offer them a better life; whereas Hagrid reveals in Order of the Phoenix that he and Madame Maxime went to try and persuade the Giants to take part in the war against Voldemort, but were thwarted when the Gurg Karkas was killed by Golgomath who succeeded him and sided with the Death Eaters. Presumably as a result, some giants took part in the Battle of Hogwarts at the end of the series, mostly fighting for Voldemort. These giants faced off against Hagrid's half-brother Grawp, Buckbeak, and some Thestrals.

The portrayal of giants as a dying breed is consistent with much of European folklore, where they are frequently described as primaeval creatures who built ruins and created strange landforms long before humans arrived.

Goblins
Goblins are magical creatures chiefly involved with metalwork and the running of Gringotts bank. They are represented by the Goblin Liaison Office in the Department for the Regulation and Control of Magical Creatures. Goblins are anthropoid, described as having long, thin fingers and feet, black eyes, and domed heads much larger than human heads in proportion to the body. Goblins eat a diet of largely raw meat, roots, and fungi and converse in a language known as Gobbledegook. They consider the true owner of an object to be its maker – that its purchaser has only licensed its use, perhaps for a lifetime – and they consider the passage of goblin-made heirlooms through Wizarding families without further payment to be theft. Wizarding law prohibits the ownership of wands by goblins, but goblins have a different magic of their own.

Relations between goblins and wizards have been strained for centuries by misunderstandings on both sides, sometimes evoking violence. Along with house-elves, goblins seem to occupy positions as second-class citizens in the Wizarding world. The goblins remain a neutral force during the Second Wizarding War, siding with neither Voldemort nor the opposition to him. In some cases, a weak friendship exists between certain wizards and goblins (particularly Bill Weasley, who works as a Curse Breaker for Gringotts Bank), and there have even been some instances of goblin-wizard interbreeding (Professor Flitwick has distant goblin ancestry, which likely accounts for his small size). The depiction of goblins in Harry Potter has been accused of containing antisemitic stereotypes.

Named goblin characters:

 Griphook – an employee at Gringotts Bank; helps Harry, Ron, and Hermione steal Helga Hufflepuff's cup
 Gornuk – goes into hiding with Griphook; later murdered by Death Eaters
 Bogrod – an associate of Griphook and fellow employee at Gringotts
 Ragnok – an influential goblin who is reluctant to put his support behind Dumbledore
 Ragnuk the First – creator of the sword of Godric Gryffindor
 Gnarlak - informant of Tina Goldstein (Fantastic Beasts character).

House-elves
House-elves are small elves enslaved by wizards. They have pointed, bat-like ears and high, squeaky voices. Their names are usually pet-like diminutives, and they do not appear to have surnames. They habitually refer to themselves in the third person. House-elves are generally obedient, pliant, and obsequious; and when enslaved, wear discarded items such as pillowcases and tea-towels draped like a toga. House-elves' masters can free them by giving them an item of clothing, much like the Hob of English folklore. House-elves can become intoxicated by drinking Butterbeer.

House-elves possess magic distinct from that used by wizards and witches, which they generally use in the service of their masters. This magic can be used without the permission of their masters, or even against their orders, though such disobedience obliges them to punish themselves in various painful ways. Among other things, this magic allows house-elves to Apparate instantly from place to place, even at Hogwarts and other places where human Apparation is prevented; and even to thus transport humans. The full extent of the elves' magic is never fully disclosed, but it seems formidable. Along with the ability to Apparate anywhere at any time, Dobby, Winky, Hokey, and Kreacher all demonstrate that they can overpower wizards when necessary: In Chamber of Secrets, Dobby forcefully repels Lucius Malfoy while protecting Harry; whereas in Harry Potter and the Goblet of Fire, when Barty Crouch Jr. is unmasked and confesses to what happened on the night of the Quiddich World Championship, he says: "Winky used her own brand of magic to bind me to her", and in Deathly Hallows, Harry tasks Kreacher with capturing Mundungus Fletcher and bringing him to 12 Grimmauld Place, a task that he accomplishes within a few days;–– even though, as Kreacher puts it, "He has many hidey-holes and accomplices". Moreover, although House-elves are not allowed to carry wands, they do not appear to need them, being capable of magical feats without them.

In Goblet of Fire, it is said that a House-elf who has been freed is expected to find a new family to serve. There is an Office of House-Elf Relocation at the Ministry of Magic to facilitate this. House-elves are unendingly loyal to their masters; so much so that Dobby, who served the Malfoy family, attempts to punish himself each time he utters a negative remark about them (even after his freedom) until the final book, in which he defies Bellatrix Lestrange. According to Kreacher, "a House-elf's highest law is his master's bidding"; however, while House-elves must obey their masters without question, they have been known to find loopholes in orders that allow for unintended interpretations to protect themselves or their friends. Because of their docile, obedient natures, some families abuse their house-elves; Dark wizard families in particular seem to make a habit thereof, as when the Malfoys forced Dobby to torture himself, or when the Black family customarily decapitated their house-elves as they became enfeebled by age. Nonetheless, most house-elves are horrified by freedom even from the most cruel masters. Dobby, the first introduced, is the sole exception; but this extends chiefly to voluntary service, paid labour, and choice of his own employment and costume. During her time at Hogwarts, Hermione establishes S.P.E.W. (the 'Society for the Promotion of Elfish Welfare') to champion House-elves' rights; but gains little interest from her classmates or the House-elves themselves. After Hermione begins leaving elf-sized clothes around the Gryffindor common room, intending for Hogwarts' House-elves to inadvertently free themselves while cleaning, the House-elves find the idea so insulting that Dobby is the only resident elf willing to clean in Gryffindor Tower.

In Deathly Hallows, Dumbledore tells Harry: "Of House-elves (...) Voldemort knows and understands nothing. Nothing. That they have a power beyond his own, a power beyond the reach of any magic, is a truth he had never grasped". Kreacher also leads the House-elves of Hogwarts into battle against Voldemort's forces.

Harry Potter depiction of race, specifically the slavery of house-elves, has received varied responses. Scholars such as Brycchan Carey have praised the books' abolitionist sentiments, viewing Hermione's Society for the Promotion of Elfish Welfare as a model for younger readers' political engagement. Other critics including Farah Mendlesohn find the portrayal of house-elves "most difficult to accept": the elves are denied the right to free themselves and rely on the benevolence of others like Hermione. Pharr terms the house-elves a disharmonious element in the series, writing that Rowling leaves their fate hanging; at the end of Deathly Hallows, the elves remain enslaved and cheerful.

Obscurials/Obscurus
Obscurials are magical children who attempt to repress their magical abilities. If kept unchecked, this repression corrupts the user's magic, creating a dark parasite force known as an obscurus. The host obscurial keeps the form of the child, appearing normal, if emotionally distressed due to their forced hiding of their magical nature. When their power is unleashed, the child and obscurus share a form of a large, shadowy, ethereal cloud, usually causing destruction due to the child themselves having little to no control over the obscurus. The host and parasite may retake the form of the child later, again with almost no input from the obscurial. Due to its consuming nature, obscurials rarely live past childhood, and obscurials who do make it to adolescence are considered outstandingly powerful magic users, though they still will have no control.

Obscurials first came into notice when wizard-kind was persecuted by non-magical users. In an attempt to hide their true nature and blend in with society, their pain would cause their magic to manifest into an obscurus. As such, obscurials are feared even among witches and wizards, who see them as not only destructive, but a threat to the International Statute of Secrecy. Even today, the creation of obscurials persists through the persecution of magical peoples all across the world.

When an Obscurial comes close to their emotional breaking point their eyes turn a milky white and the Obscurus can be observed writhing under its host's skin.

When unleashed an obscurus will normally target the source of its host's misery and distress; violently mauling the victim and leaving distinct scratch-like burns over the victim's face. Despite their violent nature an obscurus will spare those who have shown kindness and affection to their obscurial host.

Obscurus and obscurials play a crucial role in the film Fantastic Beasts and Where to Find Them, Fantastic Beasts author Newt Scamander expressing guilt for not being able to save an obscurial girl he met in Sudan. In the film's storyline, an Obscurus manifested in 1926 New York in the body of Aurelius Dumbledore, previously known as Credence Barebone who was forced to conceal his magic from his abusive adoptive mother who has formed an organization to persecute witches. Credence was sought by Gellert Grindelwald and drives him to wreak havoc across the city before he was seemingly killed by aurors under orders from the President of the Magical Congress of the United States of America, Seraphina Picquery. Credence ultimately survived this as a fragment of his obscurus escapes notice and reconstitutes him, retaining the entity throughout the events of Fantastic Beasts: The Crimes of Grindelwald while learning his true identity and later showing some control over it.

In Fantastic Beasts: The Secrets of Dumbledore, it's revealed that Dumbledore's deceased sister Ariana was also an Obscurial, having been traumatized as a young girl by an attack by Muggle children who had seen her performing magic. Credence, who is revealed to be the son of Aberforth Dumbledore, can now use both his magic and Obscurial abilities, but Dumbledore reveals that Credence's own nature is slowly poisoning him to death and he can't be saved.

Thestrals

Thestrals are an elusive, carnivorous species of winged horse, visible only to those who have witnessed and embraced a death, and described as having "blank, white, shining eyes," a "dragonish face," "long, black manes," "great leathery wings," and the "skeletal body of a great, black, winged horse"; also described by Hagrid as "dead clever an' useful", and also by Harry as "reptilian". They have acquired an undeserved reputation as omens of evil. The High Inquisitor from the Ministry of Magic, Dolores Umbridge, asserted that Thestrals are considered "dangerous creatures" by the Ministry of Magic, although this might be due to her prejudice against 'half-breeds', as Hagrid is half-giant and is showing thestrals in class.

Thestrals have fangs and possess a well-developed sense of smell, which will lead them to carrion and fresh blood. According to Hagrid, they will not attack a human-sized target without provocation. They are capable of very fast flight for several hours at a time, though they usually spend their time on the ground; and they have an excellent sense of direction. The breed is domesticable, given a willing trainer (Hagrid suspects that he has the only domesticated herd in Britain), after which they may pull loads, and make a serviceable if uncomfortable mode of transportation (Harry rides to the Ministry of Magic by thestral in the fifth book with his friends, although half of the group are unable to actually see their means of transport).

Hogwarts has a herd in the nearby Forbidden Forest and primarily uses them to pull the carriages that transport students to and from the Hogsmeade train station. They are introduced to Care of Magical Creatures students in the fifth year by Hagrid in the same year that Harry becomes able to see them after witnessing the death of Cedric Diggory, some months after it occurred. Harry only sees these beasts after he sees Cedric die, yet it is stated (in both the books and the films) that he witnessed his mother die in front of him at the age of one; therefore he logically should have been able to see them throughout the entire series, or should have started seeing them at the start of the summer holidays of that year. When asked about this discrepancy, Rowling responded that when Harry saw his mother die, he was young and did not fully understand the meaning of death and what had happened. When he saw Cedric die, he fully understood what had happened, and had time to think about it before he returned to Hogwarts and saw the Thestrals for the first time.

Thestrals are featured attacking Death Eaters in the Battle of Hogwarts at the end of Deathly Hallows. Rowling has since revealed that the Elder Wand has a core of Thestral hair, the only known wand with such a core.

Thestral, a shield bug genus, is named after Rowling's Thestrals. My Little Pony: Friendship Is Magic writer M.A. Larson also noted Thestrals as an inspiration for a bat-winged variant of Pegasus ponies featured rarely in the series.

Werewolves

The werewolf is a humanoid wolf-like creature that can exist only for a brief period around the full moon. At any other time, a werewolf is a normal human. However, the term werewolf is used for both the wolf-like creature and the normal human. A werewolf can be distinguished from a true wolf physically by several small distinguishing characteristics, including the eyes, claws, fangs, ears, snout, and tufted tail. A person becomes a werewolf when bitten by another werewolf in wolf-form. Once this happens, the person must learn to manage the condition. The Wolfsbane Potion controls some of the effects of the condition; by allowing the sufferer to maintain their human mind in wolf form, it prevents them from harming others. The potion tastes horrible and very few are skilled enough to brew it, and according to Lupin, the addition of sugar to the potion renders it useless and inert. Nothing discovered in the wizarding world can completely cure a werewolf. Most werewolves live outside normal society and steal food to survive. They generally support Voldemort, who they think will give them a better life, since they are shunned by the wizard community and are both feared and hated by the common witch and wizard.

Remus Lupin is the only known exception to this. There are only three known werewolves in the Harry Potter series: Lupin, Fenrir Greyback and an unnamed wizard who was in the same ward as Arthur Weasley in St Mungo's Hospital for Magical Maladies and Injuries. While Bill Weasley gets attacked by Greyback during the Battle of the Astronomy Tower in Half-Blood Prince, he is not a werewolf. Although Bill had a number of side-effects from the attack, including a scarred face and a new love of very rare steak, he does not become a werewolf as Greyback was in human form at the time of the bite. The condition of Lycanthropy can be hereditary, but (as seen in the case of Teddy Lupin), it is not necessarily so.

Notable individuals
Below is a list of magical creatures who have some significant role in the series.

Crookshanks
From the third book to the sixth, Crookshanks is Hermione Granger's pet cat. Crookshanks was purchased by Hermione in a shop called Magical Menagerie in the third Harry Potter book, Harry Potter and the Prisoner of Azkaban. Crookshanks resembles a Persian cat, and Rowling has described him as half-Kneazle, an intelligent catlike creature sensitive to dishonesty, explaining his identification of the rat 'Scabbers' as Peter Pettigrew, and of Sirius Black in his dog form. Crookshanks is seen in Prisoner of Azkaban talking to Padfoot in the school grounds. After his original book, he occasionally makes minor appearances to cuddle up to his owner or Harry in the Gryffindor Common Room.

In the films, Crookshanks was portrayed by a Persian cat named Pumpkin.

Dobby

Dobby is the Malfoy family's house-elf. He consistently refers to himself in the third person. He first appears in Harry Potter and the Chamber of Secrets to discourage Harry from returning to Hogwarts. Dobby later tries to keep Harry away from Hogwarts by magically sealing off the hidden entrance to Platform 9¾, only to be foiled when the protagonists pilot Arthur Weasley's flying Ford Anglia to school. During a Quidditch match, Dobby enchants a Bludger to chase Harry, hoping to cause him enough injury to be sent home; but the Bludger only manages to break Harry's arm. Dobby discloses that when an enslaved house-elf is presented with an article of clothing by his or her master, that house-elf is subsequently set free; and when Harry (after returning from the Chamber of Secrets) discovers that Dobby's master is Lucius Malfoy, he tricks Malfoy into setting Dobby free, a feat that secures him the house-elf's undying loyalty. He was now willing to protect Harry regardless of the cost; as he puts it, "Harry Potter set Dobby free!"

Dobby returns in Goblet of Fire. Now a free elf, he obtains a paid post at Hogwarts. Dobby also quickly becomes the only house-elf who will clean the Gryffindor common room, when Hermione leaves knitted clothing half-hidden around the room in an attempt to free the elves, which they find insulting. He also helps Harry get through the second task of the Triwizard Tournament by giving him Gillyweed. Dobby later appears in Order of the Phoenix, showing Harry the hidden Room of Requirement, which Harry uses for the secret meetings of Dumbledore's Army. When Professor Umbridge finds the meetings later, Dobby enters to warn the group. In Half-Blood Prince Harry entrusts Dobby to watch his compatriot Kreacher when he orders him to work in the Hogwarts kitchens with the other house-elves; and later assigns both to follow Draco Malfoy.

Dobby makes his last appearance in Deathly Hallows when Aberforth Dumbledore sends him to rescue the protagonists from Malfoy Manor after Harry asks for Aberforth's help while viewing his eye in Sirius' mirror, but in the process Dobby is killed by Bellatrix Lestrange. He is buried at Shell Cottage, beneath a headstone bearing the epitaph "Here Lies Dobby, A Free Elf".

Dobby's name is derived from a dobby, a creature in English folklore. This creature performs household chores and is kind to children, as is the character in the series.

Dobby is voiced by Toby Jones in the film adaptations of Harry Potter and the Chamber of Secrets and Harry Potter and the Deathly Hallows – Part 1. IGN put Dobby as their 24th top Harry Potter character, with his death described as "one of the most touching moments in the series." In NextMovie.com's Harry Potter Mega Poll, Dobby was voted the No. 1 favourite magical creature in the series.

Supporters of Vladimir Putin have often accused the makers of the Harry Potter films to have deliberately modeled Dobby after the Russian president.

Fawkes

Fawkes is Albus Dumbledore's pet phoenix, a mythological bird which cyclically bursts into flame upon its death and is then reborn from the ashes. Phoenix tail feathers are suitable for inclusion in some wands (both Harry and Voldemort's wands contain a feather from Fawkes' tail, the only two he ever gave) and their tears have healing powers. Fawkes can also teleport himself and others in a burst of flame.

In Chamber of Secrets, Harry's display of loyalty to Dumbledore results in his summoning Fawkes to his aid against Salazar Slytherin's basilisk in the Chamber of Secrets; whereupon Fawkes punctures the basilisk's eyes, eliminating her ability to kill with her gaze. Fawkes later uses his tears to negate the basilisk's venom; and when the basilisk is killed, conveys Harry Potter, Ron and Ginny Weasley, and Gilderoy Lockhart to their guardians. In Goblet of Fire, during the duel between Harry and Voldemort, the "reverse spell effect" ('Priori Incantatem') occurs, as both of their wands have Fawkes' feathers as their cores.

During the confrontation between Voldemort and Dumbledore in the Ministry of Magic at the climax of Order of the Phoenix (book only), Fawkes saves Dumbledore's life by swallowing a Killing Curse from Voldemort; then bursts into flame and is reborn as a chick from the ashes.

After Dumbledore's death in Half-Blood Prince, Fawkes is heard singing a lament, and thereafter is not seen again. In an interview, Rowling stated this was to symbolise the loss of Dumbledore. When asked why Fawkes did not return to Harry due to his loyalty to Dumbledore, Rowling stated that Fawkes was non-transferable between owners.

In the prequel films Fantastic Beasts: The Crimes of Grindelwald and The Secrets of Dumbledore, Fawkes appears to Credence Barebone at the conclusion of the former film as Gellert Grindelwald reveals his true identity to him: Aurelius Dumbledore, the nephew of Albus Dumbledore. Fawkes is revealed to appear to all members of the Dumbledore family when they come of age to bow before them, retconning Rowling's statement of Fawkes being non-transferable between owners to mean non-transferable between families.

According to Rowling, Fawkes is named after 17th century conspirator Guy Fawkes. Ray Fearon provided vocal effects for Fawkes in the Wizarding World film series Harry Potter and Fantastic Beasts, also voicing the centaur Firenze in Harry Potter and the Philosopher's Stone.

Firenze
Firenze is a centaur and, after Order of the Phoenix, a Divination teacher at Hogwarts. He is described in the book as a palomino centaur with astonishingly blue eyes. He first appears towards the end of Philosopher's Stone, in which he rescues Harry from Voldemort in the Forbidden Forest. Having carried Harry to safety on his back, Firenze quarrels with other centaurs who object to the symbolic suggestion that centaurs are subservient to humans.

The character does not make another appearance until Order of the Phoenix, in which he is appointed by Dumbledore to teach Divination at Hogwarts in place of Sybill Trelawney, who has been sacked by Dolores Umbridge. For this, he is ostracised by his fellows. In Half-Blood Prince, he shares teaching duties with a reinstated Trelawney.

In Deathly Hallows, he is seen near the end of the book alongside the other members of the Hogwarts staff, against Voldemort and his Death Eaters; it is mentioned that he was wounded on his flanks by the Death Eaters but ultimately survived the Battle. Although not mentioned in the series, Rowling revealed that after the Battle, Firenze's herd was "forced to acknowledge that his pro-human leanings were not shameful, and allowed him to rejoin them."

The character is based on Steve Eddy, Rowling's former English teacher, who attempted to discourage her from writing fantasy tales. Firenze is the Italian form of Florence.

Ray Fearon voiced Firenze in the film adaptation of Harry Potter and the Philosopher's Stone.

As for connections to other cultures and religions, Firenze’s character in the Harry Potter franchise is reminiscent of the most famous centaur in Greco-Roman mythology, and that person is Chiron. Chiron and Firenze share very similar traits, contrary to the barbaric and unfriendly image of centaurs towards humans. Just like Chiron, Firenze had a soft spot for humans unlike the other centaurs who did not want to do anything with humans. Furthermore, in the first film, Firenze saves Harry Potter from Voldemort in the Forbidden Forest. Lastly, Firenze and Chiron both share a close connection to heroes respectively, just as Firenze saved and fought for Harry Potter, Chiron helped train Achilles and Jason who are both famous Greek heroes.

Frank
Frank is a thunderbird that was kidnapped and trafficked to Egypt in the 1920s. In the film Fantastic Beasts and Where To Find Them, Frank is the reason Newt went to America. After rescuing Frank from the traffickers, Newt stored Frank with his other magical creatures in his suitcase. Newt brings Frank to America in hopes of returning him to his native land of Arizona.

In the climax of the film, the existence of magic is revealed to the people of New York City, following a battle between American wizarding government MACUSA and an obscurial. Knowing the secrecy of wizard-kind has been compromised, Newt releases Frank from his suitcase and gives him a potion that has memory wiping properties. Because of the thunderbird's ability to generate storms, Newt says goodbye to Frank as Frank flies into the sky, creating a rainfall using the liquid from the potion, erasing the memories of all non-magical people of the event.

Rowling revealed in a tweet following the film's release that Frank did indeed make it back to Arizona following the events of the film.

Griphook
Griphook is a goblin and an employee at Gringotts until the Second Wizarding War. In Philosopher's Stone, after Hagrid presents Harry's key and Dumbledore's letter to an unnamed goblin in the Gringotts lobby, Griphook is called to escort Harry and Hagrid through the underground rail-system to Harry's vault, and afterwards to Vault 713 to retrieve the Philosopher's Stone. He is not heard of again until Deathly Hallows, when the Snatchers holding him captive also capture Harry, Ron, and Hermione. When Hermione lies under torture to Bellatrix Lestrange that the sword of Gryffindor is a fake, Bellatrix asks Griphook for confirmation, which she receives. He is saved, along with Harry, Ron, and Hermione, by Dobby and successfully escapes to Shell Cottage. Because Harry needs to take a Horcrux from Bellatrix's vault, Griphook reluctantly agrees to help them break into Gringotts, in exchange for the sword of Gryffindor; but when escaping, Griphook betrays them to the other goblins and escapes with the sword. His fate is left unknown in the book, but in the film he is shown dead during the aftermath at Gringotts, and Gryffindor's sword vanishes before Voldemort can see it. In spite of Griphook's insistence that the sword belongs to the goblins, the sword reappears when Neville Longbottom pulls it from the Sorting Hat and uses it to behead Nagini.

The late Verne Troyer appeared as Griphook in the film adaptation of Philosopher's Stone with Warwick Davis providing his voice and the latter fully portrayed him in the Deathly Hallows films.

Hedwig

Hedwig is Harry's snowy owl, given to him in Harry Potter and the Philosopher's Stone as an eleventh birthday present by Rubeus Hagrid, who purchases the owl in Diagon Alley at the Eeylops Owl Emporium. Harry gives her this name after reading it in a book on the history of magic. Hedwig is used for delivering messages throughout the series, and also serves as a companion to Harry, especially when he is unable to interact with other wizards. It is implied throughout the books that Hedwig can fully understand Harry's speech. In the fifth book, Order of the Phoenix, Hedwig is intercepted by Dolores Umbridge and is hurt, but is later healed by Professor Grubbly-Plank. In the seventh book, The Deathly Hallows, Hedwig is killed by a curse from a Death Eater; in the film version, she is killed defending Harry from the Death Eater. According to Rowling, Hedwig's death represents the loss of Harry's innocence.

Although the character of Hedwig is female, she is played on film by male owls (female snowy owls have dark patches of plumage, while only the males are completely white). John Williams' composition which serves as title music for the entire film series is named "Hedwig's Theme".

Hokey
Hokey is a house-elf who works for Hepzibah Smith, an old woman deceived by Tom Riddle into showing him Slytherin's locket and Hufflepuff's cup, which he uses as two of his Horcruxes. Hokey's memory allows Harry and Dumbledore a glimpse of the visit Voldemort makes two days before Hepzibah Smith is poisoned and both treasures disappear; whereafter Riddle, who magically tampers with Hokey's memories, frames Hokey for Hepzibah's murder. She does not deny the accusation and is convicted for accidental murder.

Kreacher

Kreacher is a house-elf who has served the House of Black for generations and whose name is a play on the word creature. Kreacher first appears in Order of the Phoenix as an unwilling servant to Sirius Black. Kreacher disdains Sirius, mainly due to his devotion to his former masters (Regulus Black in particular), whose pure-blood values Sirius has rejected. Sirius also treats him harshly because the elf is a living reminder of a home to which he earlier had no intention of returning. Knowing too much of the Order of the Phoenix's activity, Kreacher is not allowed to leave Grimmauld Place. Kreacher has lived alone in the house for years with only the screaming portrait of Mrs. Black for company. Despite obeying Sirius, he is insolent and rude, insulting in undertones all present whom he refers to as "Blood traitors, Mudbloods and scum".  Hermione comments on this: "I don't think he realises we can hear him."

Kreacher desires to leave Sirius and serve his next of kin, Bellatrix Lestrange and the Malfoys. He betrays Sirius and persuades Harry to go to the Department of Mysteries, where a trap has been laid. Sirius is killed by Bellatrix in the ensuing combat, while trying to save Harry. Following Sirius' death, Harry inherits all of Sirius' possessions, including a highly unwilling Kreacher. Harry immediately orders him to work at Hogwarts, where he comes to blows with Dobby about his lack of loyalty to Harry.

In Deathly Hallows, Harry and his friends coax from the house-elf the current whereabouts of Salazar Slytherin's Locket, a Gaunt family heirloom and one of Lord Voldemort's Horcruxes; whereafter Harry sends Kreacher to retrieve the locket from Mundungus Fletcher and gives him its substitute as a token of remembrance (referring to Regulus Black, who alone treated Kreacher with respect). Thereafter Kreacher appears cleaner and happier, restores the house to pristine condition, and begins to treat Harry and his friends with courtesy and respect. When Grimmauld Place is infiltrated by Death Eaters, Harry decides against calling the elf back to them, fearing possible betrayal. In the Battle of Hogwarts, Kreacher rallies the Hogwarts house-elves against the Death Eaters, calling Harry his "master and defender of house elves". It is implied that he survived the battle, as Harry wonders 'whether Kreacher will bring him a sandwich' after his battle with Voldemort.

Kreacher appears in the film version of Harry Potter and the Order of the Phoenix, voiced by Timothy Bateson. Producers admitted they had wished to cut the character from the film, but when Rowling was consulted, she advised: "You know, I wouldn't do that if I were you. Or you can, but if you get to make a seventh film, you'll be tied in knots." In Harry Potter and the Deathly Hallows – Part 1, Kreacher is voiced by Simon McBurney, as Bateson had died.

Nagini
Nagini is Voldemort's huge familiar snake, introduced in Goblet of Fire. According to Indian mythology, the name Nagini means a female serpent that occasionally takes human form. Voldemort made Nagini his final Horcrux by murdering Bertha Jorkins, a muggle tramp, when he was hiding in the forests of Albania. Due to this connection, Voldemort has complete control over the snake, as Dumbledore mentions in Half-Blood Prince.

Voldemort is able to communicate with Nagini due to his ability to speak Parseltongue, the language of snakes. Nagini is first sighted when the snake alerts Voldemort to the presence of an eavesdropping Frank Bryce, an old gardener who had worked for the Riddle family. During the fourth year Harry spends at Hogwarts, Voldemort's temporary body is sustained by Nagini's venom, harvested by Peter Pettigrew. In Harry Potter and the Order of the Phoenix, Harry assumes Nagini's viewpoint during her attack on Arthur Weasley in one of his dreams; Albus Dumbledore believes this an effect of Harry's special connection to Voldemort, with Harry's witnessing the attack by virtue that Voldemort's mind "happened to be" in Nagini at the time. This is the first indication of Nagini and Voldemort's deeper connection, having the ability to share thoughts and connect with Harry.

In Deathly Hallows, Nagini consumes Charity Burbage, a Hogwarts Muggle Studies professor, after the Killing Curse is used on her. Nagini is later placed inside the corpse of Bathilda Bagshot by Voldemort, to enable a surprise assault on Harry when he visits Godric's Hollow. Because some snakes (pit vipers, boas and pythons) can sense heat and movement in a way humans cannot, Nagini is able to detect Harry and Hermione even when they are under the Cloak of Invisibility. After discovering that Harry is searching for his Horcruxes, Voldemort places Nagini into a protective magical cage to prevent her from being killed, but uses her to kill Severus Snape by expanding the cage over him. When Harry is apparently killed by Voldemort, Nagini is released from the protective enchantment and is draped around Voldemort's shoulders during the Death Eaters' victory march back to Hogwarts. This allows Neville Longbottom to behead Nagini, using Godric Gryffindor's sword. In the film, Nagini is instead protected by a force field and participates in the final battle as opposed to dying before it began; her fate is ultimately the same as in the book. In Harry Potter and the Deathly Hallows – Part 1, Hazel Douglas portrays Nagini puppeting the corpse of Bathilda Bagshot.

The prequel film Fantastic Beasts: The Crimes of Grindelwald features Nagini in 1927 France as a woman portrayed by Claudia Kim, kept as an attraction in the Circus Arcanus by its ringmaster, Skender, before running off with Credence to help him find his birth mother. The film reveals that she is a type of person known as a Maledictus whose blood curse will one day permanently transform her into an animal.

Peeves

Peeves is a poltergeist who causes trouble in Hogwarts and is therefore often pursued by the sole caretaker at the school, Argus Filch. He is capable of flight and can choose whether to be tangible; and is able to manipulate objects, a trait not generally possible with ghosts, but common among poltergeists. Peeves' existence is essentially the embodiment of disorder, which he is observed to constantly cause. In appearance, he is a small man with a mischievous face and a wide mouth, dressed in vibrantly coloured clothing. He derives joy from disaster and mischievous acts, usually causing disruptions to daily activity.

Peeves only listens to a select few: Dumbledore; the Bloody Baron; in the second book Nearly Headless Nick; and in the fifth book, Fred and George Weasley. Filch, who is usually left with cleaning up the mess and damage that Peeves causes, tries repeatedly to remove him; however, Rowling has stated in an interview that not even Dumbledore would be able to rid Hogwarts of Peeves forever. Peeves is vulnerable to some magic; in Prisoner of Azkaban, Professor Lupin uses magic to teach Peeves a lesson by making the gum Peeves was stuffing into a keyhole enter the poltergeist's nose. In Harry Potter and the Half-Blood Prince, Harry uses magic to attach Peeves' tongue to the roof of his mouth, after which Peeves angrily departs.

During Dolores Umbridge's attempts to take control of Hogwarts in Order of the Phoenix, Peeves, along with many of the non-Slytherin students, begins a concerted campaign of practical jokes and pranks at the Weasley twins' request, in order to make Umbridge's time at Hogwarts as unpleasant as possible, a task Peeves undertakes with tremendous glee. When Umbridge attempts to sneak out of Hogwarts, Peeves chases her out, whacking her with Minerva McGonagall's cane (which she lent to him expressly for that purpose) and a sock full of chalk. Many of the other professors also resent her presence and either turn a blind eye to what is done to Umbridge at the hands of Peeves and the students, or occasionally even providing a small measure of assistance. Peeves is twice depicted at the conclusion of Deathly Hallows: initially attacking Death Eaters with Snargaluff Pods; and subsequently singing a victory song praising Harry.

It is indicated that Peeves was still at Hogwarts at the time of the epilogue, since Harry tells his son Albus Severus not to "mess with Peeves".

Rik Mayall was cast as Peeves for the film adaptation of Philosopher's Stone, but his scenes were cut from the final film and do not appear in the deleted scenes section of the DVD release. He had not been made aware that his scenes had been cut until the full film was officially unveiled at the premiere. Peeves was subsequently omitted from the Harry Potter films that followed, though he can be seen in the video games.

Winky
Winky is the Crouch family's house elf, described as having enormous brown eyes and a large, round, soft nose. She views herself as a dutiful servant and guards the family's many secrets. When Barty Crouch Jr is rescued from Azkaban by his dying mother, he is supervised and nursed back to health by Winky. In Goblet of Fire, she persuades Barty Crouch Sr to let his son attend the Quidditch World Cup; she attends it with the younger Crouch, who is hiding under an Invisibility Cloak, and claims the apparently empty seat beside her is being saved for Crouch Sr. During the festivities, Crouch Jr steals Harry's wand from his pocket and later uses it to conjure the Dark Mark, in spite of Winky's attempts to stop him. In the resulting chaos, Harry and his friends see Winky running into the forest, struggling as she tries to restrain the invisible Crouch Jr. Later she is caught by Amos Diggory with Harry's wand, which is established through a priori incantatem to have been the wand used to conjure the Dark Mark; though Crouch Sr. realises what happened, he agrees with the apparent conclusion that Winky conjured the mark, and fires her on the spot, both to save face and as punishment for her failure to control Crouch Jr. Following her dismissal, Dobby takes the distraught Winky to work with him at Hogwarts. There the unhappy Winky, retaining her loyalty to Crouch, becomes an alcoholic until the final book, and eventually fights in the Battle of Hogwarts with the other house-elves.

The Weasleys' creatures
Many pets and animals are associated with the Weasley family:

 Scabbers – a brown rat retained for twelve years; at first by Percy, but passed to Ron. Near the end of the third book, Scabbers is revealed to be Peter Pettigrew, an Animagus whose betrayal of James and Lily Potter led to their deaths at the hand of Lord Voldemort.
 Pigwidgeon (nicknamed "Pig") – Ron's hyperactive scops owl, a gift from Sirius Black upon the loss of Scabbers.
 Hermes – a screech owl owned by Percy, which was a gift to him from his parents for becoming a Prefect in his fifth year. He is named after the Greek god Hermes.
 Errol – an aged great grey owl who serves as the family's courier. He has trouble carrying loads and is often found unconscious after collision or exhaustion. Possibly a reference to Errol Fuller, who wrote a few books on extinct birds.
 Arnold – a purple Pygmy Puff (miniature puffskein) owned by Ginny and obtained from Weasleys' Wizard Wheezes in the sixth book.
 A puffskein belonging to Ron and killed by Fred when he used it for Bludger practice, revealed in the first Harry Potter game, and later confirmed in Fantastic Beasts and Where to Find Them.
 A benevolent ghoul lives in the attic of The Burrow and causes minor disruptions by groaning and banging on the walls and pipes. In Deathly Hallows, the ghoul is magically altered in appearance to resemble Ron as cover for his absence from school.  The ghoul is enthusiastic about this and seems to relish the attention it receives. In 12 Grimmauld Place there is also a ghoul in "an upstairs bathroom".
 The Weasleys have gnomes all over their garden and in their shed, bushes, Wellington boots, and more. They are quarrelsome and seem to know many obscenities, which they were supposedly taught by Fred and George Weasley. Crookshanks likes to chase the gnomes while visiting; the rest of the family deals with them by physically throwing them off the grounds. In Deathly Hallows one bites Luna Lovegood; whereas Fred is bitten by one in Half-Blood Prince and as a punishment stuns it, paints it gold, gives it a miniature tutu with wings and hangs it on top of the Christmas tree as an angel.

Hagrid's pets

Over the course of the series, Hagrid cares for a large number of animals, many of them dangerous, including Aragog (a giant talking spider or 'Acromantula'), Buckbeak (Hippogriff), Fang (boarhound), Fluffy (Three-Headed Dog), Norbert (Norwegian Ridgeback Dragon; later revealed by Charlie Weasley to actually be female and renamed Norberta), and Tenebrus (Thestral). Hagrid's love for animals gets him the teaching job for Care of Magical Creatures at Hogwarts beginning in Prisoner of Azkaban, following the retirement of the course's previous instructor. In their fourth year, Harry and his classmates take care of Hagrid's Blast-Ended Skrewts (a crustacean-like predator), one of which (grown to giant size) is placed in the hedge maze for the final task of the Triwizard Tournament. Although its exoskeleton can repel spells, Harry is able to pass it unhurt. They also have lessons on Nifflers, Unicorns, Fire Salamanders and Flobberworms.

See also
 Care of Magical Creatures
 Department for the Regulation and Control of Magical Creatures
 Fantastic Beasts and Where to Find Them

References

Sources

 
 
 
 

Fictional elements introduced in 1997
Creatures
Fantasy creatures
Ghosts in written fiction
Lists of fictional animals in literature
Lists of fictional species